Petropolje is a village situated in the Kraljevo municipality of Serbia.

References

Populated places in Raška District